The 2009 Appalachian State Mountaineers football team represented Appalachian State University in the 2009 NCAA Division I FCS football season. It was the 80th season of play for the Mountaineers. The team was led by Jerry Moore, the 2006 Eddie Robinson Award winner for Coach of the Year. Moore is in his 21st season as head coach. The Mountaineers played their home games at Kidd Brewer Stadium in Boone, North Carolina.

Before the season

Schedule

Game summaries

East Carolina

McNeese State

Samford

The Citadel

North Carolina Central

Wofford

Georgia Southern

Furman

Chattanooga

Elon

Western Carolina

South Carolina State

Richmond

Montana

Roster

Coaching staff

Coach profiles at GoASU

Rankings

Awards and honors
 Walter Payton Award — Armanti Edwards
 Southern Conference Coach of the Year (coaches) — Jerry Moore
 Southern Conference Roy M. "Legs" Hawley Offensive Player of the Year (media) — Armanti Edwards
 Southern Conference Offensive Player of the Year (coaches) — Armanti Edwards
 Southern Conference Jacobs Blocking Trophy — Mario Acitelli

Statistics

Team

Scores by quarter

References

Appalachian State
Appalachian State Mountaineers football seasons
Southern Conference football champion seasons
Appalachian State Mountaineers football